Seven Cities may refer to:

 "Seven Cities" (song), a 1999 single by trance producers Solarstone
 Seven Cities (Malazan), a continent in the Malazan Book of the Fallen series
 Seven Cities of Gold (disambiguation)
 Seven cities of Delhi
 The mythical "Isle of Seven Cities", also known as Antillia
 The Seven Cities of Hampton Roads, the largest communities in southeastern Virginia
Destruction of the Seven Cities (1598-1604) in Chile.
 Yeti Shahr (seven cities), an alternate name for Altishahr (six cities), an ancient name for the Tarim Basin.
Portuguese for Sete Cidades, a National Park in Brazil

See also

 Seven hills (disambiguation)